Morales Municipality may refer to:
 Morales, Bolívar, Colombia
 Morales, Guatemala

Municipality name disambiguation pages